Below is a list of Fellows of the Linguistic Society of America.

Fellows of the LSA

2006 
 Arnold Zwicky
 Arthur S. Abramson (D)
 Barbara Partee
 Calvert Watkins (D)
 Charles J. Fillmore (D)
 D Terence Langendoen
 David M. Perlmutter
 Dell Hymes (D)
 Elizabeth C. Traugott
 Emmon Bach (D)
 Eric Hamp (D)
 Eugene Nida (D)
 Frederick Newmeyer
 Ilse Lehiste (D)
 Janet Dean Fodor
 Joan Bresnan
 Joan Bybee
 Lila R. Gleitman
 Morris Halle (D)
 Ray Jackendoff
 Sandra A. Thompson
 Sarah Thomason
 Walt Wolfram
 William Bright (D)
 William Labov

2007 
 Avram Noam Chomsky
 Bernard Comrie
 David Lightfoot
 Larry Hyman
 Laurence Horn
 Lise Menn
 Mark Aronoff
 Paul Kiparsky
 Sandra Chung
 Steven Pinker

2008 
 Geoffrey K. Pullum
 Howard Lasnik
 Ivan Sag (D)
 Jay Jasanoff
 Jerrold Sadock
 John Goldsmith
 Judith Aissen
 Marianne Mithun
 Paul Chapin (D)
 Richard S. Kayne
 Sally McConnell-Ginet

2009 
 Andrew Garrett
 Bruce Hayes
 Dan Slobin
 Edward L Keenan
 Gregory Ward
 Joan Maling
 Keren Rice
 Michael E. Krauss (D)
 Roger Shuy
 Shana Poplack
 Sheila Blumstein
 Stephen F. Anderson

2010 
 Brian D. Joseph
 Ellen Prince
 John Ohala (D)
 John Rickford
 Mark Liberman
 Peter Culicover
 Stanley Peters
 Susan Goldin-Meadow

2011 
 Anthony Kroch (D)
 B Elan Dresher
 Carol Padden
 Diane Lillo-Martin
 James McClosky
 Joseph E. Aoun
 Mary Beckman
 William Ladusaw

2012 
 Alice Harris
 Angelika Kratzer
 Elisabeth Selkirk
 Irene Heim
 Janet Pierrehumbert
 John J. McCarthy
 Jorge Hankamer
 Louis M. Goldstein
 Penelope Eckert
 Richard Meier

2013 
 David Pesetsky
 Deborah Tannen
 Dennis Preston
 Edwin Battistella
 Ellen Broselow
 Hans Henrich Hock
 Jane H. Hill (D)
 Johanna Nichols
 Thomas Roeper

2014 
 Adele Goldberg
 Beth Levin
 Don Winford
 Gennaro Chierchia
 Hagit Borer
 Lyn Frazier
 Philip Rubin
 Wallace Chafe (D)

2015 
 Andries Coetzee
 Bernard Spolsky
 C.-T. James Huang
 Donca Steriade
 Donna Jo Napoli
 Ellen Kaisse
 John Baugh
 Lyle Campbell
 Patricia Keating
 Robin Queen
 Thomas Wasow

2016 
 Alan Yu
 Eve V. Clark
 Jonathan Bobaljik
 Kai von Fintel
 Karlos Arregi
 Lisa Green
 Maria Polinsky
 Robert Blust
 Sabine Iatridou
 William Croft

2017 
 Anthony C. Woodbury
 Greg Carlson
 Gregory Stump
 Marlyse Baptista
 Nora England
 Sali Tagliamonte

2018 
 Patrick Farrell (D)
 Andrew Hippisley
 Colin Phillips
 Gillian Sankoff
 Joe Salmons
 Patrice Beddor
 Rusty Barrett
 Salikoko Mufwene

2019 
 Dan Jurafsky
 Heidi Harley
 Karen Emmorey

2020 
 Claire Bowern
 Georgia Zellou
 Ives Goddard
 Juliette Blevins
 Mary Bucholtz
 Miriam Meyerhoff
 Monica Macaulay
 Nina Hyams
 Raul Aranovich
 Rena Torres Cacoullos
 Sharon Inkelas

2021 
 Anne Lobeck
 Colleen Fitzgerald
 David Beaver
 Graham Thurgood
 Mark Baker
 Megan Crowhurst
 Ricardo Otheguy
 Richard Larson
 Sonja Lanehart

2022 
 Anne H. Charity Hudley
 Diane Brentari
 Elizabeth Hume
 Laura Michaelis
 Natalie Schilling
 Pauline Jacobson
 Robert Bayley

References

 
Lists of members of learned societies